E was a Czech experimental rock group from Brno active between 1984 and 1997. Their music fell into the wider scope of alternative, underground, and post-punk rock genres.

Background
Josef Ostřanský and Vladimír Václavek were known from the band Dunaj and from their collaboration with singer Iva Bittová. The band's frontman was singer and lyricist Vladimír Kokolia, known primarily as a painter, graphic artist, and cartoonist; he went on to work as the head teacher of graphic studio 2 at the Academy of Fine Arts in Prague.

The band's music was based upon mutually interlocking riffs of both instrumentalists, forming elaborate loops together with simple but sophisticated cross-rhythms. Kokolia's role consisted of very expressive declamations of imaginative and metaphorical existentialist lyrics, often with sarcastic humour.

Onstage, both guitarists were also equipped with a simple drum kit (snare, kick drum, tom, and hi-hat) and played those instruments simultaneously while Kokolia sometimes operated the foot electronic percussion rug. Two recorded albums represent only a part of the band's repertoire.

Former members
 Vladimír Kokolia - vocals, percussion
 Josef Ostřanský - guitar, percussion
 Vladimír Václavek - bass guitar, guitar, percussion

Discography
 E (Live album - 1990)
 I Adore Nothing (I Believe It Does Not Exist) (1994)

References

External links
 E song lyrics

Czech post-punk music groups
Czech alternative rock groups
Czech experimental music groups
Czech underground music groups
Czech experimental rock groups
Musical groups established in 1984
Musical groups disestablished in 1997
1984 establishments in Czechoslovakia
1997 disestablishments in the Czech Republic